This article lists results for French association football team OGC Nice in European competition.

Participations
As of September 2022, Nice have competed in:
3 editions of the European Cup / UEFA Champions League
1 edition of the UEFA Cup Winners' Cup
6 editions of the UEFA Cup / UEFA Europa League
1 edition of the UEFA Europa Conference League
3 participations in the Inter-Cities Fairs Cup

Record by competition
As of 16 March 2023

Matches in Europe

References

 UEFA European Cup Matches - OGC Nice

Europe
Nice